Alyas Robin Hood ( / English title: Bow of Justice) is a Philippine drama-action series broadcast by GMA Network starring Dingdong Dantes, Megan Young, Andrea Torres and Solenn Heussaff. It premiered on September 19, 2016 on GMA Telebabad primetime block and also aired worldwide on GMA Pinoy TV. The first season ended its 23-week run on February 24, 2017, with a total of 115 episodes, and was replaced by Destined to be Yours. A second and final season premiered on August 14, 2017 replacing My Love from the Star, and ended its 15-week run on November 24, 2017, with a total of 75 episodes, and was replaced by Kambal, Karibal.

Cast and Characters (Season 1)

Main cast 

Dingdong Dantes as Jose Paulo "Pepe" de Jesus Jr./Alyas Robin Hood/Christopher "Chris" Bonifacio
Megan Young as Sarri Acosta
Andrea Torres as Venus Torralba/Clara Bonifacio

Supporting cast

Sid Lucero as Dean Balbuena
Jaclyn Jose as Judy de Jesus
Cherie Gil as Margarita "Maggie" Balbuena
Lindsay De Vera as Lizzy de Jesus
Dave Bornea as Julian Balbuena
Gary Estrada as Carlos "Caloy" de Jesus
Dennis Padilla as Wilson Chan
Gio Alvarez as Jericho "Jekjek" Sumilang
Paolo Contis as S/Insp. Daniel Acosta

Recurring cast 

Rey "PJ" Abellana as Leandro Torralba
Ces Quesada as Mayor Anita "Cha" Escano
Antonette Garcia as Frida
Luri Vincent Nalus as Junior "Junjun" Aguilar
Prince Villanueva as Rex
Erlinda Villalobos as Julia "Huling" Sumilang
Caprice Cayetano as Erica "Ecai" Sumilang
Rob Moya as SPO4 Alex Cruz
 Michael Flores as
Llama Pineda
Jorrel Pineda
Anthony Falcon as Chino
Jade Lopez as Chef Pop/Ariana Grenade
Pauline Mendoza as Betchay
John Feir as Armando Estanislao

Guest cast 

Christopher de Leon as Jose Paolo de Jesus Sr.
Julius Escarga as young Pepe
Arjan Jimenez as young Caloy
Will Ashley de Leon as young Jekjek
Charles Jacob Briz as young Jojo
Vic Trio as Tomas Mayuga
Jay Arcilla as Louie Mayuga
Tanya Gomez as Chairman Adelita Mayuga
Sue Prado as Cynthia De Jesus
Joko Diaz as Mayor Ramon Arguelles
James Teng as Miggy Arguelles
Ryza Cenon as Nancy Benitez
Marnie Lapuz as Maria Benitez
Dina Bonnevie as Mama Daisy
Liezel Lopez as Miaka
Marlann Flores as Honey
Lucho Ayala as Councilor Paras
Leanne Bautista as Angela
Catherine Remperas as Rose
Diva Montelaba as Amaya
Joross Gamboa as Jojo
Tammy Brown as Ariana
Jenny Catchong as Beyonce
Crissy Marie Rendon as Rihanna
Aaron Yanga as Ipe

Cast and Characters (Season 2)

Main cast 
Dingdong Dantes as Atty. Jose Paulo "Pepe" de Jesus Jr./Atty. Jose Paulo Albano/Alyas Robin Hood
Andrea Torres as Venus Torralba/Marla Mendoza/Aphrodite Marcelo
Ruru Madrid as Andres Silang/Yoyo Boy
Solenn Heussaff as Iris Rebecca Lizeralde

Supporting cast
Jaclyn Jose as Kapitana Judy de Jesus/Lola SadAko/Victorina Deogracia y Villadolid
Edu Manzano as Governor Emilio Albano
Rey "PJ" Abellana as Leandro Torralba
Gio Alvarez as Jericho "Jekjek" Sumilang
Paolo Contis as Senior Inspector Daniel Acosta
Lindsay de Vera as Lizzy de Jesus
Dave Bornea as Julian Balbuena
Gary Estrada as Carlos "Caloy" de Jesus
Rob Moya as SPO2 Alex Cruz
Antonette Garcia as Frida
Luri Vincent Nalus as Junjun
Jay Manalo as Pablo Rodrigo
KC Montero as SPO2 Rigor Morales

Recurring cast
Super Tekla as Yvonne Lady
Kiel Rodriguez as SPO4 Brix Sandoval
Rodjun Cruz as SPO2 Chua 
Valerie Concepcion as Helga Montemayor 
Geleen Eugenio as Yaya Chona
Kenken Nuyad as Totoy Bingo
Rochelle Pangilinan as Diana dela Vega
Prince Villanueva as Rex

Flashback Appearances 
Sid Lucero as Dean Balbuena
Cherie Gil as Margarita "Maggie" Balbuena
Christopher de Leon as Jose Paulo  de Jesus, Sr.
Megan Young as Dr. Sarri Acosta
Tanya Gomez as Kapitana Adelita Mayuga

Guest stars 
Empress Schuck as young Judy de Jesus
Gab de Leon as young Jose Paulo de Jesus Sr.
Arkin del Rosario as young Governor Emilio Albano
Hiro Peralta as Miguel Rodrigo
Ina Feleo as Rosetta Rodrigo
Elle Ramirez as Reporter Susan Meneses
Stephanie Sol as Rhodora
Tess Bomb Maranon as Eloisa
Jason Francisco as Matias
Lharby Policarpio as Gerald
Ces Aldaba as Judge
Crispin Pineda as Priest
Joshua Zamora as Benjo
Norman King as Abog
Lou Veloso as Tanglaw
Denise Barbacena as Prisoner 1
Arny Ross as Prisoner 2
Mara Alberto as Prisoner 3
Sheena Halili as Lily
Phytos Ramirez as Kevin
Kevin Sagra as Patrick Morales
Karlo Duterte as Jason
Gabby Eigenmann as Doc Gabriel
Lotlot de Leon as Sionnie
Anette Samin as Missing child
Kiko Estrada as Iking
Mikee Quintos as Marya
Joe Gruta as Lolo Marcelino
Banjo Romero as Gusting
Dindo Arroyo as Boss Pacquito Domingo

References 

Alyas Robin Hood
Alyas Robin Hood